In mathematics, Probabilistic number theory is a subfield of number theory, which explicitly uses probability to answer questions about the integers and integer-valued functions. One basic idea underlying it is that different prime numbers are, in some serious sense, like independent random variables. This however is not an idea that has a unique useful formal expression.

The founders of the theory were Paul Erdős, Aurel Wintner and Mark Kac during the 1930s, one of the periods of investigation in analytic number theory. Foundational results include the Erdős–Wintner theorem and the Erdős–Kac theorem on additive functions.

See also

Number theory
Analytic number theory
Areas of mathematics
List of number theory topics
List of probability topics
Probabilistic method
Probable prime

References

Further reading
 

Number theory